In Old Kentucky is a 1909 American silent short drama film directed by D. W. Griffith. A print of the film exists in the film archive of the Library of Congress.

Cast
Verner Clarges - Mr. Wilkinson
Kate Bruce - Mrs. Wilkinson
Henry B. Walthall - Robert, the Confederate Son
Owen Moore - The Union Son
Linda Arvidson - Homecoming Party
William J. Butler - Union Soldier / Aide
John R. Cumpson - Negro Servant
Robert Harron - Extra
James Kirkwood - Homecoming Party
George Nichols - Homecoming Party
Anthony O'Sullivan - Homecoming Party
Mary Pickford - Homecoming Party
Frank Powell - Union Soldier / Confederate Soldier
Gertrude Robinson - Homecoming Party
Mack Sennett - Union Sentry

References

External links
 

1909 drama films
1909 films
Silent American drama films
American silent short films
American black-and-white films
Films directed by D. W. Griffith
1909 short films
1900s American films